The Duchy of Benevento (after 774, Principality of Benevento) was the southernmost Lombard duchy in the Italian Peninsula that was centred on Benevento, a city in Southern Italy. Lombard dukes ruled Benevento from 571 to 1077, when it was conquered by the Normans for four years before it was given to the Pope. Being cut off from the rest of the Lombard possessions by the papal Duchy of Rome, Benevento was practically independent from the start. Only during the reigns of Grimoald (c. 610–671) and the kings from Liutprand (r. 712–744) on was the duchy closely tied to the Kingdom of the Lombards. After the fall of the kingdom in 774, the duchy became the sole Lombard territory which continued to exist as a rump state, maintaining its de facto independence for nearly 300 years, although it was divided after 849.

Paul the Deacon refers to Benevento as the "Samnite Duchy" (Ducatum Samnitium) after the region of Samnium.

Foundation
The circumstances surrounding the creation of the duchy are disputed. According to some scholars, Lombards were present in southern Italy well before the complete conquest of the Po Valley: the duchy by these accounts would have been founded in 571. The Lombards may have entered later, around 590. Whatever the case, the first duke was Zotto, a leader of a band of soldiers who descended the coast of Campania. Though at first independent, Zotto was eventually made to submit to the royal authority of the north. His successor was Arechis, his nephew, and the principle of hereditary succession guided the Beneventan duchy to the end.

The Lombard duchies, part of the loosely-knit Lombard kingdom, were essentially independent, in spite of their common roots and language, and law and religion similar to that of the north, and in spite of the Beneventan dukes' custom of taking to wife women from the royal family. A swathe of territory that owed allegiance to Rome or to Ravenna separated the dukes of Benevento from the kings at Pavia. Cultural autonomy followed naturally: a distinctive liturgical chant, the Beneventan chant, developed in the church of Benevento: it was not entirely superseded by Gregorian chant until the 11th century. A unique Beneventan script was also developed for writing Latin. The 8th-century writer Paul the Deacon arrived in Benevento in the retinue of a princess from Pavia, the duke's bride. Settled into the greatest of Beneventan monasteries, Monte Cassino, he wrote first a history of Rome and then a history of the Lombards, the main source for the history of the duchy to that time as well.

Expansion
Under Zotto's successors, the duchy was expanded against the Byzantine Empire. Arechis, himself from the duchy of Friuli, captured Capua and Crotone, and sacked Byzantine Amalfi, but was unable to capture Naples. After his reign, Byzantine holdings in southern Italy were reduced to Naples, Amalfi, Gaeta, Sorrento, Calabria, and the maritime cities of Apulia (Bari, Brindisi, Otranto, etc.). In 662, Duke Grimoald I (duke since 647), went north to aid the King Godepert against his brother, the co-king Perctarit, and instead killed the former, forced the latter into exile, and captured Pavia. As king of the Lombards, he tried to reinstate Arianism over the Catholicism of the late king Aripert I. However, Arianism was disappearing even in the duchy, as was the distinction between the ethnic Lombard population and the Latin- and Greek-speaking one. In 663, the city itself was besieged by the Byzantines during the failed attempt of Constans II, who had disembarked at Taranto, to recover southern Italy. Duke Romuald I defended the city bravely, however, and the Emperor, also fearing the arrival of Romuald's father, King Grimoald, retired to Naples. However, Romuald intercepted part of the Roman army at Forino, between Avellino and Salerno, and destroyed it. A peace between the Duchy and the Eastern Empire was signed in 680.

In the following decades, Benevento conquered some territories from the Byzantines, but the main enemy of the duchy was now the northern Lombard kingdom itself. King Liutprand intervened several times to impose a candidate of his own on the ducal throne. His successor, Ratchis, declared the duchies of Spoleto and Benevento foreign countries where it was forbidden to travel without royal permission.

Secundum Ticinum

In 758, king Desiderius briefly captured Spoleto and Benevento, but with Charlemagne's conquest of the Lombard kingdom in 774, Arechis II tried to claim the royal dignity and make Benevento a secundum Ticinum: a second Pavia (the old Lombard capital). Seeing that this was impractical and would draw Frankish attention to himself, he opted instead for the title of princeps (prince). In 787, he was forced by Charlemagne's siege of Salerno to submit to Frankish suzerainty. At this time, Benevento was acclaimed by a chronicler as a Ticinum geminum—a "twin Pavia". Arechis expanded the Roman city, with new walled enclosures extending onto the level ground southwest of the old city, where Arechis razed old constructions for a new princely palace, whose open court is still traceable in the Piano di Corte of the acropolis. Like their Byzantine enemies, the dukes linked the palace compound with a national church, Saint Sophia.

In 788, the principality was invaded by Byzantine troops led by Desiderius's son, Adelchis, who had taken refuge at Constantinople. However, his attempts were thwarted by Arechis' son, Grimoald III, who had, however, partially submitted to the Franks. The Franks assisted in the repulsion of Adelchis, but, in turn, attacked Benevento's territories several times, obtaining small gains, notably the annexation of Chieti to the duchy of Spoleto. In 814, Grimoald IV made vague promises of tribute and submission to Louis the Pious, which were renewed by his successor Sico. None of these pledges were followed up, and the decreased power and influence of the individual Carolingian monarchs allowed the duchy to increase its autonomy.

The Beneventan dukes employed seal rings to confirm documents, just like the Lombard kings, and the princes may have continued to use them into the ninth century. They indicate a continuation (or imitation) of Roman forms of administration, as well as widespread literacy (or "sub-literacy").

Decline through division and conquest

In the following century despite the continuing hostility of the Frankish sovereigns, Benevento reached its apex, imposing a tribute on Naples and capturing Amalfi under Duke Sicard. When Sicard was assassinated in 839, a civil war broke out. Sicard's brother, Siconulf, was proclaimed prince in Salerno while the assassin Radelchis took the throne in Benevento. After 10 years of civil war, Emperor Louis II ended the conflict by decreeing that the duchy be split into two distinct principates: Benevento (with Molise and Apulia north to Taranto) and the Principality of Salerno. As a part of the partition, Capua was made part of the Principality of Salerno.

The crisis was aggravated by the beginning of Muslim ravages, the first Saracens having been called in by Radelchis and subsequently Siconulf in their decade-long war. Often spurred by rival Christian rulers, the Saracens attacked Naples and Salerno unsuccessfully. The Islamic colony in southern Lazio was eliminated only in 915, after the Battle of Garigliano. At the same time, however, the Byzantine Empire reconquered a great part of southern Italy, beginning at Bari, which they retook from the Saracens in 876, and eventually elevating their themes under strategoi into a Catapanate of Italy (999), further reducing the already declining Beneventan power.

In 899, Atenulf I of Capua conquered Benevento and united the two duchies. He declared them inseparable and introduced the principle of co-rule, whereby sons would be associated with their fathers, a principle soon borrowed by Salerno. However, all Langobardia minor was unified for the last time by Duke Pandulf Ironhead, who became prince of Salerno in 978. He succeeded in making Benevento an archdiocese in 969. Before his death (March 981), he had gained from Emperor Otto I the title of Duke of Spoleto also. However, he split it between his sons: Landulf IV received Benevento-Capua and Pandulf II, Salerno. Soon, Benevento was stripped away again when Pandulf, the Ironhead's nephew, rebelled, demanding his part of the inheritance.

The first decades of the eleventh century saw Benevento dwindle to less than either of her sister duchies, Salerno, then prominent, or Capua. Around 1000, Benevento still comprised 34 separate counties. In 1022, Henry II, Holy Roman Emperor conquered both Capua and Benevento, but returned to Germany after the failed siege of Troia. The Normans arrived in the Mezzogiorno in these years, and Benevento then acknowledged to be in papal suzerainty, was only an off-and-on ally. The Beneventan duke still had enough prestige to lend his son, Atenulf, to the Norman-Lombard rebellion in Apulia as leader, but Atenulf abandoned the Normans and Benevento lost what was left of its influence.

The greatest of the Norman rulers of the south was Robert Guiscard, who captured Benevento in 1053. Guiscard, in turn, gave Benevento to his nominal suzerain, Pope Leo IX. Pope Leo IX and his successors appointed a series of minor Lombards as dukes until Pope Gregory VII appointed Guiscard Prince of Benevento in 1078. Finally, in 1081, Guiscard returned the title to the papacy with little but the city remaining of the once-great principality which had determined the direction of South Italian affairs for generations. No dukes or princes were thereafter named.

In 1806, Napoleon, after conquering Benevento, named as prince the famous Charles Maurice de Talleyrand. Talleyrand held the title till 1815 and was quite capable in administering the duchy besides his other tasks. Benevento was conquered by Joachim Murat in February 1814 and at the Congress of Vienna was restored to the Pope.

Citations

References

General References

Cooper, Duff, Talleyrand (Frankfurt: 1982).

External links
 Ducato (570 ca.-774) et Principato di Benevento (774-1077) 
 I Longobardi del Sud 
 

 
Benevento
States and territories established in the 6th century
Kingdom of the Lombards
Lombards
Former duchies
Former monarchies of Europe